James McAdoo Keaton (June 11, 1899 – July 10, 1968) was an American football, basketball, and track coach.  He was the fourth head football coach at Howard Payne University in Brownwood, Texas, serving for eight seasons, from 1935 to 1942, and compiling a record of 53–19–8.  Keaton also served as the head basketball coach at Howard Payne from 1935 to 1943, tallying a mark of 95–64.

Keaton was born in Tennessee and moved with his family at the age of five to Texas.  He attended high school in Temple, Texas and played college football at Howard Payne.  In 1945 Keaton joined the football coaching staff as line coach at Southern Methodist University (SMU).  He later became track coach at SMU.  Keaton died following a cerebral hemorrhage on July 10, 1968, at Baylor Hospital in Dallas, Texas.

Head coaching record

Football

References

External links
 

1899 births
1968 deaths
American football tackles
Basketball coaches from Texas
Howard Payne Yellow Jackets football coaches
Howard Payne Yellow Jackets football players
Howard Payne Yellow Jackets men's basketball coaches
SMU Mustangs football coaches
College track and field coaches in the United States
People from Temple, Texas
Players of American football from Texas